Buddies is a 1983 Australian comedy/drama film directed by Arch Nicholson and written by John Dingwall. Dingwall won the Best Original Screenplay AFI Award for the script. The film was not a great success in 1983, as no Australian distributor wanted to release it, but Dingwall took it around the country cinemas himself, where it was well received.

Plot
Young miners Mike and Johnny work in the gem fields of central Queensland around Emerald. Conflict arises when their pick-and-shovel operation is threatened by a large scale bulldozer operator.

Cast
Colin Friels as Mike
Harold Hopkins as Johnny
Kris McQuade as Stella
Simon Chilvers as Alfred
Norman Kaye as George
Lisa Peers as Jennifer
Bruce Spence as Ted
Andrew Sharp as Peter
Dinah Shearing as Merle

Production
John Dingwall wrote the script and decided to produce it himself. He raised the money with the help of Rex Pilbeam, a former mayor of Rockhampton. Most of the money was raised in Queensland, including investment from the Queensland Film Corporation. Shooting took place on location in Emerald, Queensland and lasted six weeks.

Box office
According to Dingwall, the film tested extremely well with audiences but there was a difficulty in marketing it. Buddies grossed $81,777 at the box office in Australia, which is equivalent to $215,891
in 2009 dollars.

Awards and nominations
At the 1983 AFI awards Buddies was nominated in the Best Achievement in Sound, Best Actor in a Supporting Role (Simon Chilvers), Best Actress in a Lead Role (Kris McQuade) and Best Original Music Score (Chris Neal) categories. John Dingwall won the Best Original Screenplay AFI Award for the script.

References

External links

Buddies at the Australian screen
Buddies at Oz Movies

1983 films
Australian comedy-drama films
1983 comedy-drama films
Films set in Queensland
Films shot in Queensland
Films about mining
1980s buddy comedy-drama films
Films scored by Chris Neal (songwriter)
1980s English-language films
Films directed by Arch Nicholson
1980s Australian films